Lissothrips is a genus of thrips in the family Phlaeothripidae.

Species
 Lissothrips clayae
 Lissothrips corticosus
 Lissothrips dentatus
 Lissothrips discus
 Lissothrips dispar
 Lissothrips dugdalei
 Lissothrips eburifer
 Lissothrips flavidus
 Lissothrips flavitibia
 Lissothrips furvoviridis
 Lissothrips gersoni
 Lissothrips hurricanus
 Lissothrips hypni
 Lissothrips muscorum
 Lissothrips obesus
 Lissothrips okajimai
 Lissothrips tallagandai
 Lissothrips taverni
 Lissothrips tepoztlanensis
 Lissothrips thomsonae
 Lissothrips uniformis
 Lissothrips xalapaensis
 Lissothrips zacualtipanensis

References

Phlaeothripidae
Thrips
Thrips genera